Branko Crvenkovski (pronounced ; born 12 October 1962) is a Macedonian politician who served as Prime Minister of Macedonia from 1992 to 1998 and again from 2002 to 2004, and as President of Macedonia from 2004 to 2009. He was also leader of the Social Democratic Union of Macedonia.

Background and earlier career

Crvenkovski was born in Sarajevo, Bosnia and Herzegovina, then part of Yugoslavia.

In 1986 he obtained a bachelor's degree in Computer Science and Automation from the School of Electrical Engineering at the Ss. Cyril and Methodius University in Skopje.

He was elected member of the Assembly of the Socialist Republic of Macedonia at the first multi-party elections in Yugoslavia in 1990 after serving for several years as head of department at the Semos company in Skopje. A former communist, Crvenkovski has been at the head of the Social Democratic Union of Macedonia since April 1991.

Prime Minister of Macedonia

On 5 September 1992 he became Macedonia's second prime minister after its secession from Yugoslavia and continued in the post for another four years following the December 1994 elections.

He served as Prime Minister from 1992 to 1998 and from 2002 until 2004. He was most recently elected in 2002 after his Social Democratic Union of Macedonia party won parliamentary elections.

In July 1997 he ordered that Albanian flags in front of government buildings in western part of Macedonia be removed. The situation escalated with one person dead and many injured. In 2005, on his initiative, the Albanian flag was legalized.

President of Macedonia

He won the  April 2004 presidential election against Saško Kedev and took office on 12 May 2004. He then resigned as Prime Minister.

Crvenkovski did not run for a second term in the March 2009 presidential election. Instead, he returned to his party and was elected to be the head of the party on 24 May 2009.

Honours and awards

Branko Crvenkovski is an Honorary Member of Raoul Wallenberg Foundation.

See also
List of state visits made by Branko Crvenkovski

References

External links

Official site of the President of the Republic of Macedonia

|-

|-

1962 births
Eastern Orthodox Christians from North Macedonia
Living people
Members of the Macedonian Orthodox Church
Politicians from Sarajevo
Presidents of North Macedonia
Prime Ministers of North Macedonia
Social Democratic Union of Macedonia politicians
Ss. Cyril and Methodius University of Skopje alumni